The seventh season of the American television comedy The Office premiered on September 23, 2010 and concluded on May 19, 2011 on NBC. The season consisted of 26 half-hours of material, divided into 22 half-hour episodes and two hour-long episodes. The seventh season aired on Thursdays at 9:00 p.m. (ET) as part of Comedy Night Done Right. It stars Steve Carell, Rainn Wilson, John Krasinski, Jenna Fischer, B. J. Novak, and Ed Helms, with supporting performances from Leslie David Baker, Brian Baumgartner, Creed Bratton, Kate Flannery, Mindy Kaling, Ellie Kemper, Angela Kinsey, Paul Lieberstein, Oscar Nunez, Craig Robinson, Phyllis Smith, Zach Woods, and Amy Ryan. This was the last season to feature Michael Scott, played by Carell, as the lead character. The seventh season was released on DVD and Blu-ray in region 1 on September 6, 2011.

Production
The seventh season of the show is produced by Reveille Productions and Deedle-Dee Productions, both in association with Universal Media Studios. The show is based upon the British series created by Ricky Gervais and Stephen Merchant, both of whom are executive producers on both the U.S. and UK versions. The Office is produced by Greg Daniels, who is also an executive producer. Returning writers from the previous season include Mindy Kaling, B. J. Novak, Paul Lieberstein, Brent Forrester, Justin Spitzer, Aaron Shure, Charlie Grandy, Daniel Chun, Warren Lieberstein, and Halsted Sullivan. New writers in the seventh season include Peter Ocko, Jon Vitti, Steve Hely, Carrie Kemper (sister of Ellie Kemper), Robert Padnick, and Amelie Gillette. Paul Lieberstein serves as executive producer and showrunner, and Novak was promoted from co-executive producer to executive producer midseason. Kaling, Shure, Chun and Ocko are co-executive producers; Forrester and Vitti are consulting producers; Spitzer and Grandy are supervising producers; and Warren Lieberstein, Halsted Sullivan and Steve Hely are producers.

The Office was filmed on a studio set at Valley Center Studios in Van Nuys, California. Only establishing shots for the opening theme of the city of Scranton, Pennsylvania, where the show is set, were made on location there.

Plot
Notable plots and subplots that affect the seventh season and beyond include:
 Dwight's purchase of the Scranton Business Park, where Dunder Mifflin is situated
 Erin's new relationship with Gabe 
 Pam quitting sales and becoming the office administrator 
 Angela beginning a relationship with State Senator Robert Lipton, whom Oscar believes is a closeted homosexual
 Holly's return to Scranton and Michael's lingering romantic feelings for her
 Michael's move to Colorado after getting engaged to Holly
 The brief regional manager tenures of DeAngelo Vickers and Dwight
 The search for a new permanent regional manager, which includes Andy, Darryl, Robert California, Nellie Bertram and David Brent.

Cast

Many characters portrayed by The Office cast are based on the British version of the show. While these characters normally have the same attitude and perceptions as their British counterparts, the roles have been redesigned to better fit the American show. The show is known for its generally large cast size, with many of its actors and actresses known particularly for their improvisational work.

Main
 Steve Carell as Michael Scott, Regional Manager of the Dunder Mifflin Scranton Branch. Loosely based on David Brent, Gervais' character in the British version, Scott is a dim-witted and lonely man, who attempts to win friends as the office comedian, usually making himself look bad in the process. 
 Rainn Wilson as Dwight Schrute, who, based upon Gareth Keenan, is the office's top-performing sales representative. 
 John Krasinski as Jim Halpert, a sales representative, assistant manager, and prankster and for a while co-manager, who is based upon Tim Canterbury, and is in love with his wife and mother of his child Pam Beesly, the former receptionist for Dunder Mifflin Scranton Branch and is now a sales representative. 
 Jenna Fischer as Pam Halpert, who is based on Dawn Tinsley. She is shy, but in many cases a cohort with Jim Halpert, who is her loving husband and father of her child, in his pranks on Dwight. 
 B. J. Novak as Ryan Howard, a temporary worker, who is based on Ricky Howard and Neil Godwin.
 Ed Helms as Andy Bernard, a preppy salesman with anger issues, who tries to win back Erin throughout the season. Andy has no counterpart in the British series.

Starring
 Leslie David Baker as Stanley Hudson, a grumpy salesman.
 Brian Baumgartner as Kevin Malone, a dim-witted accountant, who is based on Keith Bishop.
 Creed Bratton as Creed Bratton, the office's strange quality assurance officer.
 Kate Flannery as Meredith Palmer, the promiscuous supplier relations representative.
 Mindy Kaling as Kelly Kapoor, the pop-culture obsessed customer service representative.
 Ellie Kemper as Erin Hannon, the receptionist and love interest of Andy.
 Angela Kinsey as Angela Martin, a judgemental accountant.
 Paul Lieberstein as Toby Flenderson, the sad-eyed human resources representative.
 Oscar Nunez as Oscar Martinez, an intelligent accountant, who is also gay.
 Craig Robinson as Darryl Philbin, the warehouse supervisor.
 Phyllis Smith as Phyllis Vance, a motherly saleswoman.
 Zach Woods as Gabe Lewis, the director of Sabre sales.
 Amy Ryan as Holly Flax, a HR representative and Michael's love interest.

Special guest stars
 Kathy Bates as Jo Bennet, the CEO of Sabre Industries.
 Timothy Olyphant as Danny Cordray, an expert salesman.
 Will Ferrell as Deangelo Vickers, Michael's replacement as regional manager.

Recurring
 Hugh Dane as Hank Tate, the building's security guard.
 Bobby Ray Shafer as Bob Vance, Phyllis' husband, who runs Vance Refrigeration.
 Linda Purl as Helene Beesly, Pam's mother and Michael's ex-girlfriend.
 David Koechner as Todd Packer, a rude and offensive traveling salesman, who's Michael's best friend.
 Jack Coleman as Robert Lipton, a state senator and Angela's new boyfriend.
 Cody Horn as Jordan Garfield, an assistant hired by Deangelo.

Notable guests
 Evan Peters as Luke Cooper, Michael's nephew.
 Melora Hardin as Jan Levinson, a former Dunder Mifflin employee and Michael's ex-girlfriend.
 Nancy Carell as Carol Stills, a real estate agent and Michael's ex-girlfriend.
 Amy Pietz as Donna Newton, a married woman who was having an affair with Michael in season 6.
 David Denman as Roy Anderson, a former warehouse worker and Pam's ex-fiancé.
 Rashida Jones as Karen Filippelli, Jim's ex-girlfriend, who is now regional manager of the Utica branch.
 James Spader as Robert California, an eccentric man who interviews for the regional manager position.
 Catherine Tate as Nellie Bertram, a British woman and a friend of Jo, who interviews for the regional manager position.
 Ricky Gervais as David Brent, a cocky man who interviews for the regional manager position. He was the inspiration for Michael from the original British version of the series.
 Will Arnett as Fred Henry, a man who interviews for the regional manager position.
 Ray Romano as Merv Bronte, an anxious man who interviews for the regional manager position.
 Warren Buffett as an unnamed interviewee for the regional manager position.
 Jim Carrey as the Finger Lakes guy, an unnamed man who left his family on a vacation at the Finger Lakes in order to interview for the regional manager position.

Casting
On June 28, 2010, it was confirmed that the seventh season would be Steve Carell's last on the show, as his contract was expiring. NBC confirmed that the series would continue after his departure, and would welcome any return appearances by Carell. Actor and writer/co-executive producer B. J. Novak renewed his contract with Universal Media Studios through an eighth season and was promoted to full executive producer halfway through the seventh season. As of this season, Zach Woods, who plays Gabe Lewis on the show, has been promoted to a series regular. Executive producer/writer/actor Paul Lieberstein confirmed that Amy Ryan, who portrays Holly Flax, would appear in eight episodes of the season. He also confirmed Kathy Bates would return as Jo Bennett in the season premiere. Melora Hardin returns as Jan Levinson. Timothy Olyphant guest starred in two episodes as rival salesman, Danny Cordray, who previously went on two dates with Pam. Jack Coleman appears in a new recurring role as Senator Robert Lipton, who is dating Angela. Amy Ryan made her first return appearance as Holly in a voice-only role in "Sex Ed", and finally returned to Dunder Mifflin in the hour-long Christmas episode; and she is now billed among the rest of the starring cast.

The episode titled "Threat Level Midnight", which aired February 17, 2011, revolved around the screening of Michael's film where all the office employees portray the characters in the film. The episode featured Melora Hardin as Jan, and the return of Rashida Jones as Karen and David Denman as Roy. During NBC's TCA press tour, it was confirmed that Steve Carell would depart with three episodes left to go in the season, with the remaining episodes focusing on the search for (and selection of) his replacement as office manager. Executive producer Greg Daniels, who wrote Carell's farewell, stated the top candidates are Andy, Dwight, and Darryl, or possibly a newcomer. He also stated that whoever becomes the new manager would not become the main focus of the show like Michael was, and that two new regular cast members would join the cast during the eighth season. Ricky Gervais reprised his role as David Brent from the original British series in a cameo appearance in the episode "The Seminar" that aired January 27, 2011. Will Ferrell appeared in four episodes as Deangelo Vickers, Michael Scott's temporary replacement. Ferrell's character proved to be just as inept as Michael when it came to managing a business. Steve Carell finished filming his final scenes for the show on March 4, 2011. Ricky Gervais returned as David Brent in the season finale, along with Will Arnett who played a new character. Gervais also contributed to the script for the season finale. Ray Romano, James Spader, Catherine Tate, Warren Buffett and Jim Carrey also appeared in the season finale.

Reception

Ratings

The series aired on Thursdays at 9:00 p.m. as part of Comedy Night Done Right television block. The season premiere, "Nepotism" received a 4.4/11 percent share in the Nielsen ratings among viewers aged 18 to 49, meaning that 4.4 percent of viewers aged 18 to 49 watched the episode, and 11 percent of viewers watching television at the time watched the episode. It was viewed by 8.4 million viewers, marking a slight increase in viewers from the sixth season premiere "Gossip". The season hit a low with the 16th episode, "Todd Packer", which was viewed by only 6.12 million viewers. Conversely, the season's 22nd episode, "Goodbye, Michael", was the highest-rated episode of the season, being watched by 8.42 million viewers. The finale, "Search Committee" was viewed by 7.29 million viewers, a marked increase from the sixth-season finale "Whistleblower" which garnered only 6.6 million viewers.

For the 2010–2011 season, The Office ranked as the 53rd-most watched program, averaging a total of 7.731 million viewers. In the 18- to 49-year-old demographic, the show was the 11th-most watched television program of the broadcasting year.

Critical reception
This season received mostly positive reviews from television critics, with many claiming that it was an improvement over the sixth season. Cindy White of IGN gave the season an 8 out of 10, calling it "great." She felt that the departure of Steve Carell helped reinvigorate the series, as well to see the character of Michael evolve and mature over the course of the season naturally. She also noted that the show proved it could survive without Carell. She highlighted the episodes "Threat Level Midnight", "Garage Sale" and "Goodbye, Michael" as the best episodes of the season. Randy Miller III of DVD Talk felt that the majority of the season was "better than the sixth by a country mile" and that it was a "year that's still worth watching". He applauded the way the show was able to write-out Carell's character, noting that "Goodbye, Michael" combined "nostalgia, comedy and a little drama to get its point across". However, he was critical of several of the episodes that follow Carell's departure, and he called Ferrell's character a "full-blown psycho".

Phillip Maciak of Slant Magazine awarded the season three stars out of four, and felt that the season showcased the skills of the ensembles cast. He wrote that it "has made a convincing argument, not that Michael Scott can be replaced, but that he doesn't need to be." Myles McNutt of The A.V. Club commented that, while he felt that the season was uneven, it was a "distinct improvement over season six," claiming Carell's exit gave the show a "sense of focus that was absent last year." James Poniewozik of Time called the season "mixed at best" and that the best episodes of the season "played almost like a series of vignettes and set pieces that allowed the characters to just be." He ended with saying it was an improvement over the sixth season and that he generally enjoyed the season overall.

Awards

During the seventh season, The Office received two award nominations at the 2011 Writers Guild of America Awards. Aaron Shure was nominated in Episodic Comedy category for writing the episode, "WUPHF.com", and the series was nominated for Best Comedy Series. The series was also nominated for Outstanding Performance by an Ensemble in a Comedy Series for the 17th Screen Actors Guild Awards. Steve Carell was nominated for four comedic acting awards, at the 17th Screen Actors Guild Awards, 68th Golden Globe Awards, 37th People's Choice Awards and the 2010 Satellite Awards. At the 1st Critics' Choice Television Awards, the series was nominated for Best Comedy Series, while Steve Carell was nominated for Best Actor in a Comedy Series. For the 63rd Primetime Emmy Awards, the series received four nominations—for Outstanding Comedy series, Steve Carell for Outstanding Lead Actor in a Comedy Series, Greg Daniels for Outstanding Writing for a Comedy Series for "Goodbye, Michael", and for Outstanding Sound Mixing for a Comedy or Drama Series (Half-Hour) and Animation for "Andy's Play".

Episodes

In the following table, "U.S. viewers (million)" refers to the number of Americans who viewed the episode on the night of broadcast. Episodes are listed by the order in which they aired, and may not necessarily correspond to their production codes.

 denotes a "super-sized" 40-minute episode (with advertisements; actual runtime around 28 minutes).
 denotes an hour-long episode (with advertisements; actual runtime around 42 minutes).

References

External links
 
 

 
2010 American television seasons
2011 American television seasons